Pasochoa (4,200 metres) is an extinct volcano located in the Guayllabamba river basin in the Ecuadorian Andes. The current mountain form is a collapsed crater with a semicircular shape.  This structure emerged approximately 100 thousand years ago due to an eruption which destroyed the crater and occidental slope of the previous volcanic cone.

Lava and ash increased the fertility of the ground in the Pasochoa region, encouraging the growth of a vibrant forest ecosystem. Despite the fertile soil, difficult accessibility and an uneven surface made the area inappropriate for extensive agriculture. The Pasochoa Wildlife Refuge, established in 1996, contains one of the few remaining original Andean forests.  Fundacion Natura used to manage the Pasochoa and offer programs on the natural resource conservation and environmental education and sponsors scientific research. Recently, the mountain's management has passed to the hands of the Ministerio del Ambiente.  The mountain has a wonderful variety of wildlife, including pumas, foxes, skunks, a very diverse collection of birds, and a wonderful collection of plants.

Today the volcano is well known as a travel destination.

See also
List of volcanoes in Ecuador

References

External links

Stratovolcanoes of Ecuador
Geography of Pichincha Province
Tourist attractions in Pichincha Province
Pleistocene stratovolcanoes